Alexander Varlamov is the name of:

Alexander Egorovich Varlamov (1801–1848), Russian composer
Alexander Vladimirovich Varlamov (1904–1990), Russian composer
Aleksandr Varlamov (b. 1979), Russian diver